Jointing may refer to:

 Edge jointing of a board to ensure that it is straight, square and smooth, usually prior to joining two or more boards together to create a wider board.
 Jointing the teeth of a saw blade or the edges of cutting knives, card scrapers etc.
 Jointing the mortar joints in brickwork.
 In geology jointing, refers to the formation of natural fractures in rocks.
 In agriculture, the jointing stage is that point at which the internodal tissue in the grass leaf begins to elongate, forming a stem (culm).
 In petroleum standardization, jointing refers to the process of generating joint standard test methods (STM), by two or more standardization bodies, that are technically equivalent.
 Jointing of electricity power or telecom cables